Enjoy Records was a record label owned and operated by Bobby Robinson from 1962 through the mid-1980s, and was run out of his record shop at 125th Street and 8th Ave. in Harlem. Starting with blues, R&B, and rock and roll, the label recorded many of the  original old-school hip hop groups and MCs, including Grandmaster Flash and the Furious Five, the Funky 4+1, Spoonie Gee, and the Treacherous Three, beginning in 1979. The label closed down in 1987, although Robinson's shop remained opened.

See also
 Everloving Records, a record label which was known as Enjoy Records from 2000-2003.
 The Best of Enjoy! Records, a compilation of hip hop music released by the label
 List of record labels

References

External links 
 

Defunct record labels of the United States
Rock and roll record labels
Rhythm and blues record labels
Hip hop record labels
Record labels established in 1962
Record labels disestablished in 1987